The Northeastern State RiverHawks are the athletic teams that represent Northeastern State University, located in Tahlequah, Oklahoma, in intercollegiate sports as a member of the Division II level of the National Collegiate Athletic Association (NCAA), primarily competing in the Mid-America Intercollegiate Athletics Association (MIAA) for most of its sports since the 2012–13 academic year; while its men's soccer team competes in the Great American Conference (GAC). The RiverHawks previously competed as an NCAA D-II Independent during the 2011–12 school year; in the D-II Lone Star Conference (LSC) from 1997–98 to 2010–11; and in the Oklahoma Intercollegiate Conference (OIC) of the National Association of Intercollegiate Athletics (NAIA) from 1974–75 to 1996–97.

Name change
Northeastern State University announced on May 23, 2006, that it would be dropping "Redmen" and selecting a new mascot. The change was made proactively in response to the 2005 NCAA Native American mascot decision. The university announced its new athletic name as the RiverHawks on November 14, 2006.

Varsity teams 
NSU competes in 11 intercollegiate sports sports: Men's sports include baseball, basketball, football, golf and soccer; while women's sports include basketball, golf, soccer, softball, spirit squads and tennis.

Men's basketball 
In 2003, the men's basketball team won the NCAA Division II National Championship, beating Kentucky Wesleyan 75–64.

Spirit Squads
The university also offers participation in spirit squads at athletic and other school sponsored events.
 Pom Squad
 Cheerleading

Cheerleading
The Northeastern State University cheerleaders are coached by Krystal Cooper.  The Squad last competed in National Cheerleaders Association collegiate nationals in 2013, placing 3rd in the Intermediate Coed Division II category.

Pom Squad
The Northeastern State University pom squad is currently coached by Lauren Perez.

Notable alumni

Carrie Underwood, American Idol winner and country music singer
Billy Bock, late baseball coach for four high schools winning nine state titles
Jarrett Byers, former St. Louis Rams wide receiver
Larry Coker, former head coach at the University of Miami
Bob Hudson, former NFL player
Ronnie Jones, American football coach
Derrick Moore, former NFL player
Ryan Helsley, current pitcher for the St. Louis Cardinals

References

External links